Victor Ramos Ferreira (born 5 May 1989) is a Brazilian footballer who plays as a central defender.

Club career
Victor Ramos was born in Salvador, Bahia. He joined Vitória's youth setup in 1999, aged ten, and was promoted to the main squad in 2008.

Victor Ramos made his professional – and Série A – debut on 16 November 2008, playing the full 90 minutes in a 1–2 away loss against Atlético Paranaense. Mainly a second-choice, he only established himself as a starter after the arrival of new manager Paulo César Carpegiani.

Victor Ramos scored his first goal in the main category of Brazilian football on 12 July 2009, netting the fourth in a 6–2 home routing of Santos. He finished the campaign with 17 appearances, being a regular starter.

On 31 August 2009, Victor Ramos moved abroad and joined Belgian Pro League side Standard Liège, for a rumoured €1 million fee. He only made his debut for the club on 4 November, coming on as a half-time substitute for Mohamed Sarr in a 2–0 UEFA Champions League home win against Olympiacos.

On 20 July 2011, after being demoted to Standard's reserve team back in January, Victor Ramos was loaned to Vasco da Gama until the end of the year. However, he failed to impress and acted mainly as a backup to his former Vitória teammate Anderson Martins.

On 31 January 2012 Victor Ramos returned to Vitória, in a season-long loan deal. He was an undisputed starter for the side during the year, appearing in 33 league matches and scoring a career-best five goals as his side returned to the top tier.

On 17 December 2013 Victor Ramos moved to Liga MX side C.F. Monterrey, signing a two-year deal. In July of the following year he was announced at Vitória on loan, but the move was later declared void by his parent club.

On 12 January 2015 Victor Ramos was loaned to Palmeiras, for one year. After being sparingly used, he left the club and served a subsequent loan stint at Vitória before rescinding his contract with his parent club.

On 6 April 2017, Victor Ramos signed for Chapecoense. He left the club in October 2017.

On 20 December 2017, Victor Ramos joined China League One side Meizhou Meixian Techand, becoming the first foreign player in club's history. However, he had his contract terminated by mutual consent on 18 January 2018.

After four games and two months with Guarani, Victor Ramos moved to Vitória in March 2019. In May, he joined CRB.

On 18 February 2021, Victor Ramos was presented at Botafogo-SP. On 22 June, he returned to CRB, but failed to appear in a single match for the latter, mainly due to injury.

On 8 March 2022, Victor Ramos was announced at his former club Chapecoense. On 1 December, he signed for Portuguesa, but left the club on a mutual agreement the following 9 February.

Career statistics

Honours
Vitória
Campeonato Baiano: 2009, 2013

Standard Liège
Belgian Cup: 2010–11

Palmeiras
Copa do Brasil: 2015

Chapecoense
Campeonato Catarinense: 2017

References

External links
Footgoal profile

1989 births
Living people
Sportspeople from Salvador, Bahia
Brazilian footballers
Association football defenders
Campeonato Brasileiro Série A players
Campeonato Brasileiro Série B players
Esporte Clube Vitória players
CR Vasco da Gama players
Sociedade Esportiva Palmeiras players
Associação Chapecoense de Futebol players
Belgian Pro League players
Standard Liège players
Liga MX players
C.F. Monterrey players
Goiás Esporte Clube players
Guarani FC players
Clube de Regatas Brasil players
Botafogo Futebol Clube (SP) players
Associação Portuguesa de Desportos players
Brazilian expatriate footballers
Brazilian expatriate sportspeople in Belgium
Expatriate footballers in Belgium
Brazilian expatriate sportspeople in Mexico
Expatriate footballers in Mexico
Expatriate footballers in China
Brazilian expatriate sportspeople in China